Michel Rodriguez (born 25 November 1978, in Montpellier) is a French former football defender who last played for FC Rouen.

Career
Rodriguez won the 1997 UEFA European Under-18 Championship with France.

Honours
Montpellier
UEFA Intertoto Cup: 1999

References

External links
 

1978 births
Living people
French footballers
France youth international footballers
Association football defenders
Montpellier HSC players
Amiens SC players
AS Cannes players
Tours FC players
Stade Lavallois players
US Créteil-Lusitanos players
FC Rouen players
Ligue 1 players
Ligue 2 players
Championnat National players